Eileen Lemass (born 7 July 1932) is a former Irish Fianna Fáil politician, who served as a Teachta Dála (TD) from 1977 to 1987, and also as a member of the European Parliament from 1984 to 1989.

Early life and education 
She was born in Cork in 1932, and was educated at St. Kevin's School, the National College of Art, Grafton Academy of Dress Designing and the Abbey Theatre School of Acting.

Political career 
She became involved in politics in 1974 when she was first elected to Dublin City Council. In 1976 she unsuccessfully contested the by-election in Dublin South-West caused by the death of her 47-year-old husband Noel Lemass, son of former Taoiseach Seán Lemass and brother-in-law of future Taoiseach Charles Haughey.

She was first elected to Dáil Éireann for Dublin Ballyfermot at the 1977 general election. Lemass was elected again at the 1981 general election, this time for Dublin West, but lost her Dáil seat in February 1982.

She won re-election in that year's second general election in November 1982. Two years later in 1984, she was elected to the European Parliament for the Dublin constituency. She served as the chair of the Committee on Youth, Culture, Education, Information and Sport between 1987 and 1989. 

In 1982, Lemass opposed pressure that the European Economic Community was placing on Ireland, Greece, and Belgium to legalise abortion. Speaking to the Irish Times, Lemass said, “It is lucky that Ireland has adopted the constitutional amendment to protect the life of the unborn. These moves bear out the claims of pro-amendment people that pressure to allow abortions in Ireland is coming from the European parliament.”

She retired from domestic politics at the 1987 election and from European politics in 1989 when she lost her European seat.

References

External links

1932 births
Living people
Fianna Fáil MEPs
Fianna Fáil TDs
Lemass family
MEPs for the Republic of Ireland 1984–1989
Members of the 21st Dáil
Members of the 22nd Dáil
Members of the 24th Dáil
20th-century women Teachtaí Dála
Politicians from County Dublin
Spouses of Irish politicians
20th-century women MEPs for the Republic of Ireland
Alumni of the National College of Art and Design
Local councillors in Dublin (city)